The 2000 North Rhine-Westphalia state election was held on 14 May 2000 to elect the 13th Landtag of North Rhine-Westphalia. The outgoing government was a coalition of the Social Democratic Party (SPD) and The Greens led by Minister-President Wolfgang Clement.

The SPD remained the largest party but declined to 42.8%, its worst result since 1958. However, the opposition Christian Democratic Union (CDU) failed to capitalise, falling slightly to 37%. The Free Democratic Party (FDP) returned to the Landtag in third place with 10%, while the Greens took losses and recorded 7%. Overall, the incumbent government retained a reduced majority. Minister-President Clement met with FDP lead candidate Jürgen Möllemann post-election, but the SPD settled on renewing the coalition with the Greens. Clement was re-elected by the Landtag on 21 June.

Electoral system
The Landtag was elected via mixed-member proportional representation. 151 members were elected in single-member constituencies via first-past-the-post voting, and fifty then allocated using compensatory proportional representation. A single ballot was used for both. The minimum size of the Landtag was 201 members, but if overhang seats were present, proportional leveling seats were added to ensure proportionality. An electoral threshold of 5% of valid votes is applied to the Landtag; parties that fall below this threshold are ineligible to receive seats.

Background

In the previous election held on 14 May 1995, the SPD lost their Landtag majority for the first time since 1980. The CDU recorded another poor performance with under 38% of the vote, while the FDP fell to 4% and lost their seats. The Greens achieved a significant victory with 10% and held balance of power in the Landtag, subsequently forming a coalition government with the SPD.

In May 1998, long-serving Minister-President Johannes Rau resigned. He was succeeded by state economics minister Wolfgang Clement, who continued the coalition with the Greens.

Parties
The table below lists parties represented in the 12th Landtag of North Rhine-Westphalia.

Campaign
Minister-President Clement stated he hoped for the SPD to regain its parliamentary majority, but that he could also accept a coalition with either the Greens or the FDP. The CDU under lead candidate Jürgen Rüttgers aimed to win government, in coalition with the FDP if necessary. The Greens campaigned for a continuation of the outgoing coalition, and capitalised on the SPD's ambivalence toward coalition partners with the slogan: "If you want red-green, you have to vote Green." The FDP ran with former Vice-Chancellor Jürgen Möllemann as their lead candidate, and sought to re-enter the Landtag and surpass the Greens for third place.

The CDU were dragged down by the ongoing donations scandal which began at the end of the previous year; their popularity in state polling fell from a high of 46% in December to just 32% in March.

Opinion polling

Results

External links

References

Elections in North Rhine-Westphalia